Neoterebra limatula is a species of sea snail, a marine gastropod mollusk in the family Terebridae, the auger snails.

Description

Distribution
This marine species occurs off Guadeloupe.

References

 Terryn, Y. (2007). Terebridae: A Collectors Guide. Conchbooks & Natural Art. 59 pp + plates.
 Rosenberg, G.; Moretzsohn, F.; García, E. F. (2009). Gastropoda (Mollusca) of the Gulf of Mexico, Pp. 579–699 in: Felder, D.L. and D.K. Camp (eds.), Gulf of Mexico–Origins, Waters, and Biota. Texas A&M Press, College Station, Texas
 Terryn Y. (2011) A new species, a lost type and its forgotten name and more terebrid discoveries in the Caribbean (Gastropoda: Terebridae). Novapex 12(3-4): 63-72.
 Garcia, E. F. 2012. Terebra limatula Dall,1889 and T. acrior Dall, 1889 (Gastropoda: Terebridae); two problematic taxa from the western Atlantic. Zootaxa 3328: 66-68.

External links
 Fedosov, A. E.; Malcolm, G.; Terryn, Y.; Gorson, J.; Modica, M. V.; Holford, M.; Puillandre, N. (2020). Phylogenetic classification of the family Terebridae (Neogastropoda: Conoidea). Journal of Molluscan Studies

Terebridae
Gastropods described in 1889